The Commuter Train (previously called Tongil-ho) is a class of short-run commuter trains operated by Korail, the national railroad of South Korea. They typically operate once or twice daily in each direction, along a few tens of kilometers of track. They thus provide an important function for many smaller rural communities (and also some New Towns around Seoul), which often lack good transit connections. The Commuter Train suspended its operation on April 1, 2019, due to the construction for the Soyosan-Yeoncheon extension of Seoul Subway Line 1. The services were untouched for nine months, until it started its operation again on January 1, 2020, this time between GwangjuSongjeong and Gwangju, with one stop at Geungnakgang on the Gwangju Line in Gwangju.

Trains
 Original Tongil-ho Passenger Car (retired)
 Tang eng Tongil-ho Passenger Car (retired)
 Electric Excellent Car/Korail 9900 series (retired)
 Commuter Diesel Car (CDC)

Operation

Current
 Gwangju Line: Gwangju – GwangjuSongjeong

Former
 Gyeongbu Line: Replaced with Mugunghwa-ho
 Honam Line: Replaced with Mugunghwa-ho
 Gyeongjeon Line: Replaced with Mugunghwa-ho
 Jinhae Line: Replaced with Saemaeul-ho
 Daegu Line: Replaced with Mugunghwa-ho
 Jungang line: Replaced with Mugunghwa-ho
 Donghae Nambu Line: Replaced with Mugunghwa-ho & the Donghae Line, part of the Busan Metro
 Jeolla Line: Replaced with Mugunghwa-ho
 Gyeongwon Line: Suspended because of the construction of the extension of Seoul Subway Line 1 from Soyosan to Yeoncheon
 Gyeongui Line: Replaced by the Gyeongui-Jungang Line and the DMZ Train
 Gunsan Hwamul Line: Replaced with Saemaeul-ho & Mugunghwa-ho. (Gunsan Hwamul Line is now closed, replaced with the Gunsan Port Line. The section between Gunsan and Iksan has been merged with the Janghang Line)
 Jeongseon Line: Replaced with Mugunghwa-ho

See also
Korail
Railroads in South Korea
Transportation in South Korea

External links
Photo set

Passenger trains of the Korail